The United Nations Training Center of the Bundeswehr in Hammelburg was founded in October 1999 and is the training center of the Bundeswehr for preparing military and civilian personnel for UN operations within the framework of international conflict prevention and crisis management.

References

External links 
 

1999 establishments in Germany
Germany and the United Nations
Military education and training in Germany
Bundeswehr
German Army (1956–present)